Quan Lei (born 13 January 1985 in Dalian, Liaoning) is a Chinese football midfielder.

Biography 
Quan Lei would start his footballer career playing for Dalian Shide's youth team as well as also playing for the Chinese Under-19 football team in 2003 before graduating to Dalian's senior team in the 2004 league season where he made his league debut on November 11, 2004, against Shanghai Shenhua in a 1–0 win. When Vladimir Petrović became the new Dalian manager he quickly praised Quan and included him as a first team regular within the side that won the league and cup double.

On October 5, 2006, Quan was badly wounded in a knife attack by two assailants and was stabbed eight times in the attack. It was discovered that the two assailants were hired by a disgruntled female fan who had a brief relationship with the player, while all three members involved with the attack were sentenced to three years of imprisonment. Despite the severe injuries he received as well as the court case that followed he resumed training in January 2008. Quan would eventually make his long-awaited return on May 3, 2008, against Wuhan Optics Valley F.C. in a league game that ended in a 1–1 draw, however this was later changed to a 3–0 win to Dalian after Wuhan decided to quit the league.

On 28 January 2016, Quan transferred to China League One club Nei Mongol Zhongyou.

Honours
Dalian Shide
 Chinese Super League: 2005
 Chinese FA Cup: 2005

References

External links 
 News about Quan Lei at Sina.com
Player stats at sohu.com

1985 births
Living people
Chinese footballers
Footballers from Dalian
Dalian Shide F.C. players
Qingdao Hainiu F.C. (1990) players
Inner Mongolia Zhongyou F.C. players
Chinese Super League players
China League One players
Association football midfielders
21st-century Chinese people